FFE may refer to:

 Fakes Forgeries Experts, a philatelic journal
 Fast Field Echo in magnetic resonance imaging
 Fédération Française des Éclaireuses
 Feed-Forward Equalizer
 FFE Transportation, an American transport company
 Finished floor elevation
 Fire For Effect, a military doctrine
 Fire-From-Enclosure (FFE), M72A28 Light Anti-Tank (AT) Weapon (LAW) variant
 First.Finger Entertainment, an American entertainment and media company
Ford Focus Electric
 Foundation For Excellence, a non-profit organization which supports students in India
 Foras Feasa ar Éirinn, a narrative history of Ireland by Geoffrey Keating
 Free-Flow Electrophoresis
 Station Code FFE for Fremantle railway station, in Australia
 French Chess Federation
 French Fencing Federation
 Frontier: First Encounters, a video game
 Fukuoka Futures Exchange in Japan
 Furniture, Fixtures & Equipment (accounting)